Richard Lawrence Hunter, FBA (born 30 October 1953) is an Australian classical scholar. From 2001 to 2021, he was the 37th Regius Professor of Greek at the University of Cambridge.

Early life and education
Hunter was born was born on 30 October 1953. He grew up in Australia, and was educated at Cranbrook School, an independent school in Sydney. He studied at the University of Sydney, graduating with a Bachelor of Arts (BA Hons) degree in 1974. He then moved to England, where he studied for a Doctor of Philosophy (PhD) degree at the University of Cambridge; he was a member of Pembroke College, Cambridge. His doctoral thesis was titled "A commentary on Euboulos", and his PhD was awarded in 1979.

Academic career
After completing his PhD, Hunter became a lecturer at the University of Cambridge and a Fellow of Pembroke College, Cambridge. In 2001 he was appointed as the Regius Professor of Greek at Cambridge in succession to P. E. Easterling and became a Fellow of Trinity College, Cambridge. He retired as Regius Professor in October 2021, giving his valedictory lecture on 27 September 2021.

Hunter is a member of the Academy of Athens, an Honorary Fellow of the University of Sydney and has an honorary degree from the Aristotle University of Thessaloniki. He serves on the advisory board of the periodical Materiali e discussioni per l'analisi dei testi classici. Since 2013 he is president of the council of Aristotle University of Thessaloniki.

In 2013 Richard Hunter was elected a Fellow of the British Academy.

Publications
 Eubulus: The Fragments (Cambridge, 1983)
 A Study of Daphnis & Chloe (Cambridge, 1983)
 The New Comedy of Greece and Rome (Cambridge, 1985)
 Apollonius of Rhodes: Argonautica Book III (Cambridge, 1989)
 The 'Argonautica' of Apollonius: literary studies (Cambridge, 1993)
 Theocritus and the Archaeology of Greek Poetry (Cambridge, 1996)
 Studies in Heliodorus (Cambridge, 1998)
 Theocritus. A Selection (Cambridge, 1999)
 Theocritus: Encomium of Ptolemy Philadelphus (Berkeley, 2003)
 Plato's Symposium (Oxford, 2004)
 Tradition and Innovation in Hellenistic Poetry (with M. Fantuzzi) (Cambridge, 2004)
 The Hesiodic Catalogue of Women: Constructions and Reconstructions  (Cambridge, 2005)
 The Shadow of Callimachus (Cambridge, 2006)
 On Coming After: Studies in Post-Classical Greek Literature and its Reception (Berlin, 2008)
 Wandering Poets in Ancient Greek Culture (with I. Rutherford) (Cambridge, 2009)
 Critical Moments in Classical Literature (Cambridge, 2009)
 Plutarch, How to study poetry (with D. Russell) (Cambridge, 2011)
 Plato and the Traditions of Ancient Literature: the silent stream (Cambridge, 2012)
 Hesiodic Voices. Studies in the Ancient Reception of Hesiod's Works and Days (Cambridge 2014)
 Dionysius of Halicarnassus and Augustan Rome'' (ed.; with Casper C. de Jonge) (Cambridge 2018)

References

External links
On Coming After, Inaugural lecture as Regius Professor of Greek, 17 October 2001
The Silence Of The Sirens: readings of Homer then and now Lecture given at the ceremonies' hall of the University of Athens, March 2006

1953 births
Australian classical scholars
University of Sydney alumni
Fellows of Pembroke College, Cambridge
Fellows of Trinity College, Cambridge
Living people
Members of the University of Cambridge faculty of classics
Regius Professors of Greek (Cambridge)
Fellows of the British Academy
People educated at Cranbrook School, Sydney
Foreign Members of the Academy of Athens (modern)